Heribert Faßbender (born 30 May 1941 in Ratingen) is a German sports journalist.

Life 
Faßbender worked since 1963 for German broadcaster Westdeutscher Rundfunk (WDR) and later for sport magazine Sportschau on German broadcaster ARD. He is married and lives in Leverkusen.

Works 
 
 "Die deutsche WM-Geschichte", Delius Klasing Bielefeld, 2006.
 "Das Sporttagebuch des 20. Jahrhunderts", ECON Düsseldorf, 1984.
 "Olympische Spiele 1992", Falken Niedernhausen, 1992.
 "Fußballjahrbücher 1990/91/92/93/94/95", Falken Niedernhausen.

Awards 
 2001: Order of Merit of North Rhine-Westphalia

References

External links 

20th-century German journalists
21st-century German journalists
German sports journalists
German sports broadcasters
German male journalists
German journalists
1941 births
Living people
ARD (broadcaster) people
Westdeutscher Rundfunk people